Thomas Graham may refer to:

Politicians and diplomats
Thomas Graham, 1st Baron Lynedoch (1748–1843), British politician and soldier
Thomas Graham Jr. (diplomat) (born 1933), nuclear expert and senior U.S. diplomat
Sir Thomas Graham (barrister) (1860–1940), South African lawyer and politician
Ted Graham, Baron Graham of Edmonton (Thomas Edward Graham, born 1925), British Labour Co-operative politician
Tommy Graham (politician) (1943–2015), Scottish Member of Parliament for Renfrew West and Inverclyde
Thomas Jefferson Graham (1832–1902), American politician in Wisconsin and Montana

Scientists and medics
Thomas Graham (chemist) (1805–1869), Scottish chemist
Thomas Graham (apothecary) (1666–1733), apothecary to King George I and George II
Thomas J. Graham (born 1962), American orthopaedic surgeon

Sportspeople
Thomas Graham (footballer, born 1887) (1887–1967), English football centre forward
Tommy Graham (footballer, born 1905) (1905–1983), English international footballer
Tommy Graham (footballer, born 1955), Scottish football forward
Tommy Graham (Australian rules footballer) (1886–1933), Australian rules footballer
Tom Graham (American football) (1950–2017), American football player
Thomas Graham Jr. (American football) (born 1999), American football player
Tom Graham (rugby union) (1866–1945), Wales national rugby player
Tom Graham (volleyball) (born 1956), Canadian volleyball player

Other
Thomas Graham (artist) (1840–1906), Scottish artist
Thomas N. Graham (1837–1911), Union Army soldier in the American Civil War and Medal of Honor recipient
Tommy Graham (singer), Canadian singer and record producer
Tommy Graham, editor of History Ireland magazine
Tom Graham, a pseudonym of Sinclair Lewis

See also

Thomas Grahame (1840–1907), Ontario political figure